Kingston Collection is a one-story enclosed upscale shopping center and mall located in the South Shore region of Massachusetts in the United States. As of January 2022, The mall features 37 stores and restaurants. Anchor stores include Macy's, Target and HotDoogy.

History
The Kingston Collection opened in 1989 in Kingston. Originally named the Independence Mall, the original anchors to the mall were Filene's, Filene's Basement, JCPenney, Sears, and Hoyts Cinema.

On December 5, 2011, construction began on a brand new, 58,000 square foot Regal Cinemas 14 complex, to replace the original, out-of-date Hoyts Cinema. On November 20, 2013, plans for a drastic renovation of the mall were announced, and would include changing the entire exterior facade, an interior face-lift (including tile work, new paint coatings, and renovated restrooms), plush soft seating areas with free Wifi, new stores and dining options, and a larger selection of stores overall. Other pieces of the project included the reopening of the basement (which had not been open to the public since 1998, and would also be extensively renovated), redevelopment of the center court and the former Best Buy (which closed in 2010), and the addition of an F-100 indoor racetrack, K1 Speed.

On November 11, 2014, the Kingston Collection was evacuated due to a Tier2 HazMat situation. A witness in the food court said that she was getting a coffee and the lights went out, then the fire alarm went off. People also in the cinema were evacuated, with people describing the smell like pepper spray. Ambulances, Firefighters and police arrived at the scene, with two people being brought to the hospital.

On October 23, 2014, it was announced that Sears would be closing as part of a plan to close 77 stores nationwide. The store closed in January 2015. In early 2021, the former Sears was demolished and apartments will be built on that site.

References

External links
 Kingston Collection

Buildings and structures in Plymouth County, Massachusetts
Shopping malls in Massachusetts
Independence Mall
Kingston, Massachusetts
Shopping malls established in 1989
1989 establishments in Massachusetts